National Justice Party and similar terms may also refer to:

The Right Stuff (blog)#National Justice Party
People's Justice Party (Malaysia)
Justice and Development Party (Turkey)
National Justice Party (Peru)
Justice Party (India)
Justice Party (Turkey)
Justice Party (South Korea)
Democratic Justice Party
Prosperous Justice Party
Animal Justice Party
Liberty and Justice Party
Justice and Development Party (Morocco)
Justice and Welfare Party
Singapore Justice Party
Justice and Reconciliation Party
Justice Party (United States)
Party of Freedom and Justice
Indian Justice Party
Justice Party (Egypt)
Justice Party (Ukraine)
Party of Social Justice
Justice Party of Denmark